Praise Tonha (born 29 March 1995) is a Zimbabwean footballer who plays as a defender for Kansanshi Dynamos F.C.

Career

Kansanshi Dynamos
Following a season at Buildcon, Tonha joined Zambian club Kansanshi Dynamos in August 2021. He signed a two-year contract with the club.

International
Tonha was capped at the U23 level with Zimbabwe, before graduating to the senior international roster in 2014. He made his debut in September, making a substitute appearance in a friendly match against Botswana. In November 2017, he was included in Zimbabwe's provisional squad for the 2017 CECAFA Cup prior to the teams' withdrawal.

Career statistics

International

References

External links

1995 births
Living people
How Mine F.C. players
CAPS United players
Zimbabwe Premier Soccer League players
Zimbabwean footballers
Zimbabwe international footballers
Association football defenders